Alain Feutrier (born 16 February 1968) is a French former alpine skier who competed in the 1988 Winter Olympics and 1992 Winter Olympics.

He was born in St Jean de Maurinne, France and did not succeed in winning any podium medals at the Winter Olympics that he competed in.

External links
 sports-reference.com
https://www.olympic.org/alain-feutrier
http://www.valloire.net/uk/il4-office,winter_p402-alain-feutrier.aspx

1968 births
Living people
French male alpine skiers
Olympic alpine skiers of France
Alpine skiers at the 1988 Winter Olympics
Alpine skiers at the 1992 Winter Olympics
20th-century French people